The International Racquetball Federation's 20th Racquetball World Championships were held in Guatemala City, Guatemala from November 26 to December 6. This is the first time Worlds have been in Guatemala, and the second consecutive time a Central American country has hosted the event after Costa Rica in 2018.

In 2021, Mexican Paola Longoria won her fourth World Championship in women's singles, which set the record for most titles - one more than Americans Cheryl Gudinas and Michelle Gould. Longoria defeated American Kelani Lawrence in the final, and Lawrence, as the 11th seed, was a surprise finalist.

Tournament format
The 2021 World Championships used a two-stage format with an initial group stage that was a round robin with the results used to seed players for a medal round.

Group stage

Pool A

Pool B

Pool C

Pool D

Pool E

Pool F

Medal round

References

Racquetball competitions